The Beneteau First 26 is a French sailboat that was designed by Jean-Marie Finot of Groupe Finot as a cruiser-racer and first built in 1984.

Production
The design was built by Beneteau in France from 1984 to 1991 with about 300 examples completed, but it is now out of production.

Design

The First 26 is a recreational keelboat, built predominantly of fiberglass, with wood trim. The deck is a sandwich of balsa, fiberglass and polyester. It has a deck-stepped mast with aluminum spars, a masthead sloop rig, a raked stem, a slightly reverse transom, a transom-hung rudder controlled by a tiller and a fixed fin keel or, optionally, a stub keel and centreboard. It has  of headroom in the main cabin and sleeping accommodation for five people.

The boat is fitted with a Swedish Volvo 2001  diesel engine for docking and maneuvering.

Variants
First 26 fin keel
This model displaces  and carries  of ballast.
First 26 centreboard
This model displaces  and carries  of ballast.

Operational history
In a 2010 review Steve Henkel wrote about the boat, "best features: The cabin layout is refreshingly unusual, with a dedicated space for a navigator's station, a head located aft, and a complete-looking galley (except for no icebox!). Worst features: The diesel engine, housed under the companionway ladder, will make the aft double berth hot in summer (but cozy in winter, if you like sailing among the icicles)."

See also
List of sailing boat types

Similar sailboats
Beneteau First 265
C&C 26
C&C 26 Wave
Contessa 26
Dawson 26
Discovery 7.9
Grampian 26
Herreshoff H-26
Hunter 26
Hunter 26.5
Hunter 260
Hunter 270
MacGregor 26
Mirage 26
Nash 26
Nonsuch 26
Outlaw 26
Paceship PY 26
Parker Dawson 26
Pearson 26
Sandstream 26
Tanzer 26
Yamaha 26

References

External links

Keelboats
1980s sailboat type designs
Sailing yachts
Sailboat types built by Beneteau
Sailboat type designs by Groupe Finot